The Guldbagge Newcomer Award, instituted in 2015 for the 51st Guldbagge Awards, is a Newcomer Award presented annually by the Swedish Film Institute (SFI) as part of the Guldbagge Awards (Swedish: "Guldbaggen") to people working in the Swedish motion picture industry.

Recipients

2010s

2020s

See also 
 Guldbagge Awards
 Guldbagge Honorary Award

References

External links 
  
  
 

Newcomer Award
Awards established in 2015